Londesborough is a village and civil parish in the East Riding of Yorkshire, England.
The civil parish is formed by the village of Londesborough and the hamlet of Middlethorpe.
According to the 2011 UK census, Londesborough parish had a population of 182, a reduction of one on the 2001 UK census figure.

Some scholars suggest the still-undiscovered Roman camp of Delgovicia is in the vicinity of Londesborough. Londesborough Hall was a country house in the village but all that now remains is the park land that surrounded the house which is called Londesborough Park. The church dedicated to All Saints was designated a Grade I listed building in 1967 and is now recorded in the National Heritage List for England, maintained by Historic England. In 1823 Londesborough was a civil parish in the Holme Beacon Division in the Wapentake of Harthill. Londesborough is one of the sites in the East Riding that have been conjectured as the Romano-British town of Delgovicia, an eastern station associated with York. A Roman road from Brough on the Humber Estuary ran directly north to meet Londesborough estate and village, where were found Roman coins and burial repositories. 

The estate of Londesborough was one of the seats of the Dukes of Devonshire. It was an historical possession of the Clifford family—Earls of Cumberland—until the 5th Earl's only heiress married the Earl of Cork, from whose family the Dukes of Devonshire are descended. The estate's mansion in 1823 had recently been demolished. The 6th Duke of Devonshire was the patron of All Saints' Church, the ecclesiastical parish living, and a hospital for "six old bachelors or widowers, and six widows". Londesborough population in 1823 was 244. Within the parish was a blacksmith, a clerk, a schoolmaster who was also the parish clerk, the parish rector, the agent for the Duke of Devonshire, and the landlord of The Devonshire Arms  public house who was also a maltster. Londesborough was served by Londesborough railway station on the York to Beverley Line between 1847 and 1965.

Notable people
 Mark Briggs, a notable Great War conscientious objector in New Zealand, was born in Londesborough in 1884. He emigrated to New Zealand with his father and brother, where he became a radical trade unionist and socialist. In 1917, he was forcibly shipped to France, where he was subjected to much pain and humiliation from the military to force him to give up his principles. He did not and was eventually returned to New Zealand. He later became a member of New Zealand's Legislative Council, where the former minister of war, James Allen, publicly apologised for his treatment.

References

External links

Villages in the East Riding of Yorkshire
Civil parishes in the East Riding of Yorkshire